Khlong Toei Nuea is a khwaeng (subdistrict) of Watthana District, in Bangkok, Thailand. In 2020, it had a total population of 9,313 people.

References

Subdistricts of Bangkok
Watthana district